Sainbayaryn Jambaljamts (born 4 September 1996) is a Mongolian cyclist, who currently rides for UCI Continental team .

Major results

2016
 2nd Road race, National Under-23 Road Championships
 4th Road race, National Road Championships
2018
 1st  Road race, National Under-23 Road Championships
 3rd  Road race, Asian Under-23 Road Championships
2019
 1st Points classification, Tour of Xingtai
 National Road Championships
2nd Road race
2nd Time trial
 7th Overall Tour of China II
 8th Overall Tour of Fuzhou
1st Stage 6
2021
 1st  Overall Tour of Thailand
 1st Kahramanmaraş Grand Prix Road Race
 2nd Grand Prix Kayseri
 2nd Grand Prix Erciyes
 2nd Germenica Grand Prix Road Race
 4th Grand Prix Develi
 5th Time trial, National Road Championships
2022
 National Road Championships
1st  Time trial
3rd Road race
 1st Grand Prix Develi
 Asian Road Championships
2nd  Team time trial
3rd  Road race
 2nd Overall Tour of Sakarya
 3rd Grand Prix Gündoğmuş
 4th Grand Prix Velo Alanya
 4th Grand Prix Cappadocia
 6th Overall Tour of Sharjah
 9th Overall Tour de Langkawi

References

External links

1996 births
Living people
Mongolian male cyclists
Cyclists at the 2018 Asian Games
Asian Games competitors for Mongolia
Sportspeople from Ulaanbaatar
21st-century Mongolian people